Export Insurance Agency of Russia (EXIAR) (ЭКСАР; Officially: Russian Agency for Insurance Export credits and Investments) is a Russian government agency, which was established on October 13, 2011 as the successor for the Russian Export-Import Insurance Company (Российское экспортно-импортное страховое общество), that had existed since April 23, 1996.

Among its missions are in supporting the Russian export aboard, through insurance of export credits against commercial and political risks, as well as Russian investments abroad against political risks.

The sole shareholder of the company  Vnesheconombank (Foreign Economic Bank).

The Agency’s charter capital makes RUR 30 billion (ca USD 1 billion). In line with the international practices EXIAR is aimed at developing financial instruments for export state support providing insurance for export credits against commercial and political risks and covering political risks related to Russian investments abroad.

Core activities of EXIAR are insurance of short-, mid- (up to 2 years) and long-term (up to 20 years) export and financial credits against commercial and political risks, as well as insurance of Russian investments abroad against political risks.

Missions  
 Enhancement and support for Russian technology and equipment export
 Insurance support for Russian exporters entering new and risky markets
 Progressive implementation and adaptation of the bestinternational practices and standardsin export credit insurance in the Russian system of financial export support
 Enhanced access to financing
 Increased exports to new markets
 Support for private banks in financing Russian exporters

See also
Export credit agency
Export-Import Bank of the United States
Rossotrudnichestvo
US AID

External links

References

Civil affairs
Government agencies established in 2011
International development agencies
Organizations based in Moscow
2011 establishments in Russia
Export credit agencies
Government agencies of Russia
Foreign trade of Russia